Pensacola is a genus of jumping spiders that was first described by George and Elizabeth Peckham in 1885.

Species
 it contains nine species, found in Central America, Venezuela, Guyana, Ecuador, Brazil, and Mexico:
Pensacola castanea Simon, 1902 – Brazil
Pensacola cyaneochirus Simon, 1902 – Ecuador
Pensacola gaujoni Simon, 1902 – Ecuador
Pensacola murina Simon, 1902 – Brazil, Guyana
Pensacola ornata Simon, 1902 – Brazil
Pensacola poecilocilia Caporiacco, 1955 – Venezuela
Pensacola radians (Peckham & Peckham, 1896) – Panama
Pensacola signata Peckham & Peckham, 1885 (type) – Guatemala
Pensacola sylvestris (Peckham & Peckham, 1896) – Mexico, Guatemala

References

External links
 Diagnostic drawings of Pensacola species

Salticidae genera
Salticidae
Spiders of Central America
Spiders of Mexico
Spiders of South America